Sonn is a surname. Notable people with the surname include: 

Caren Sonn (born 1968), German hurdler
Christopher Sonn (born 1967), Australian social psychologist
Claudia Sonn (born 1966), German footballer
Percy Sonn (1949–2007), South African lawyer and cricket administrator
Philipp Sonn (born 2004), German footballer
Ralf Sonn (born 1967), German high jumper
Tamara Sonn, American academic in Islamic and religious studies

See also
Sonn., taxonomic author abbreviation of Pierre Sonnerat (1748–1814), French naturalist